Saadia Mebarek, who died on May 25, 1960, was an Algerian woman arrested, tortured and killed by French soldiers during the Algerian war.

Biography 
She married to Mohamed Kader, a crane operator, and was pregnant when she was arrested in Algiers on May 24, 1960. Her husband filed a complaint two days later Saadia was found dead in the early morning of May 25. She was brought on a stretcher, by a French soldier, to the Mustapha Pacha hospital.

Investigation, research and trial

Official report 
On June 3, 1960, President Charles de Gaulle asked Prime Minister Michel Debré to initiate an investigation: "The facts denounced are of particular gravity. [...] It goes without saying that if torture is established, exemplary sanctions will have to be taken”. According to the army report transmitted on June 11 by Minister Pierre Messmer, Saadia Mebarek was suspected, along with four other women, of "abstentionist propaganda for the cantonal elections", in a context where the  National Liberation Front called for the 'abstention.The trial of an active lieutenant and two reserve second lieutenants suspected of having tortured Saadia Mebarek to death.

Trial 
The trial was held behind closed doors in January 1962 at the Permanent Armed Forces Tribunal.This is, according to Sylvie Thénault and Raphaëlle Branche, the only trial involving soldiers involved in operations in Algeria.

The accused admitted the facts with which they were charged. However, the soldiers present in court acquitted the three defendants. Thus, “the army would not take responsibility for the abuses committed during the war, for which it ultimately holds the political power responsible”.

References 

20th-century Algerian women
People murdered in Algeria
Violence against women in Algeria
1960 deaths